An extinct language is a language that no longer has any speakers, especially if the language has no living descendants. In contrast, a dead language is one that is no longer the native language of any community, even if it is still in use, like Latin. A dormant language is a dead language that still serves as a symbol of ethnic identity to a particular group. These languages are often undergoing a process of revitalisation. Languages that currently have living native speakers are sometimes called modern languages to contrast them with dead languages, especially in educational contexts.

In the modern period, languages have typically become extinct as a result of the process of cultural assimilation leading to language shift, and the gradual abandonment of a native language in favour of a foreign lingua franca, largely those of European countries.

As of the 2000s, a total of roughly 7,000 natively spoken languages existed worldwide. Most of these are minor languages in danger of extinction; one estimate published in 2004 expected that some 90% of the currently spoken languages will have become extinct by 2050.

Language death

Normally the transition from a spoken to an extinct language occurs when a language undergoes language death by being directly replaced by a different one. For example, many Native American languages were replaced by English, French, Portuguese, Spanish or Dutch as a result of European colonization of the Americas.

In contrast to an extinct language, which no longer has any speakers, or any written use, a historical language may remain in use as a literary or liturgical language long after it ceases to be spoken natively. Such languages are sometimes also referred to as "dead languages", but more typically as classical languages. The most prominent Western example of such a language is Latin, but comparable cases are found throughout world history due to the universal tendency to retain a historical stage of a language as the liturgical language.

Historical languages with living descendants that have undergone significant language change may be considered "extinct", especially in cases where they did not leave a corpus of literature or liturgy that remained in widespread use (see corpus language), as is the case with Old English or Old High German relative to their contemporary descendants, English and German.

Some degree of misunderstanding can result from designating languages such as Old English and Old High German as extinct, or Latin dead, while ignoring their evolution as a language. This is expressed in the apparent paradox "Latin is a dead language, but Latin never died." A language such as Etruscan, for example, can be said to be both extinct and dead: inscriptions are ill understood even by the most knowledgeable scholars, and the language ceased to be used in any form long ago, so that there have been no speakers, native or non-native, for many centuries. In contrast, Old English, Old High German and Latin never ceased evolving as living languages, nor did they become totally extinct as Etruscan did. Through time Latin underwent both common and divergent changes in phonology, morphology, syntax and lexicon and continues today as the native language of hundreds of millions of people, renamed as different Romance languages and dialects (French, Italian, Spanish, Corsican, Asturian, Ladin, etc.). Similarly, Old English and Old High German never died, but developed into various forms of modern English and German. With regard to the written language, skills in reading or writing Etruscan are all but non-existent, but trained people can understand and write Old English, Old High German and Latin. Latin differs from the Germanic counterparts in that an approximation of its ancient form is still employed to some extent liturgically. This last observation illustrates that for Latin, Old English, or Old High German to be described accurately as dead or extinct, the language in question must be conceptualized as frozen in time at a particular state of its history. This is accomplished by periodizing English and German as Old; for Latin, an apt clarifying adjective is Classical, which also normally includes designation of high or formal register.

Minor languages are endangered mostly due to economic and cultural globalization, cultural assimilation, and development. With increasing economic integration on national and regional scales, people find it easier to communicate and conduct business in the dominant lingua francas of world commerce: English, Mandarin Chinese, Spanish and French.

In their study of contact-induced language change, American linguists Sarah Grey Thomason and Terrence Kaufman (1991) stated that in situations of cultural pressure (where populations are forced to speak a dominant language), three linguistic outcomes may occur: first - and most commonly - a subordinate population may shift abruptly to the dominant language, leaving the native language to a sudden linguistic death. Second, the more gradual process of language death may occur over several generations. The third and most rare outcome is for the pressured group to maintain as much of its native language as possible, while borrowing elements of the dominant language's grammar (replacing all, or portions of, the grammar of the original language).

Institutions such as the education system, as well as (often global) forms of media such as the Internet, television, and print media play a significant role in the process of language loss. For example, when people migrate to a new country, their children attend school in the country, and the schools are likely to teach them in the majority language of the country rather than their parents' native language.

Language revival

Language revival is the attempt to re-introduce an extinct language in everyday use by a new generation of native speakers. The optimistic neologism "sleeping beauty languages" has been used to express such a hope, though scholars usually refer to such languages as dormant.

In practice, this has only happened on a large scale successfully once: the revival of the Hebrew language.  Hebrew had survived for millennia since the Babylonian exile as a liturgical language, but not as a vernacular language.  The revival of Hebrew has been largely successful due to extraordinarily favourable conditions, notably the creation of a nation state (modern Israel in 1947) in which it became the official language, as well as Eliezer Ben-Yehuda's extreme dedication to the revival of the language, by creating new words for the modern terms Hebrew lacked. 

Revival attempts for minor extinct languages with no status as a liturgical language typically have more modest results. The Cornish language revival has proven at least partially successful: after a century of effort there are 3,500 claimed native speakers; enough for UNESCO to change its classification from "extinct" to  "critically endangered".  A Livonian language revival movement to promote the use of the Livonian language has managed to train a few hundred people to have some knowledge of it.

Recently extinct languages

This is a list of languages reported as having become extinct since 2010.
For a more complete list, see List of extinct languages.

|}

See also

:Category:Extinct languages
Endangered language
Globalization
Language attrition
Language death
Language revival
Language teaching
Lists of extinct languages
Lists of endangered languages
List of modern literature translated into dead languages
List of revived languages

Notes

References

Bibliography

 Adelaar, Willem F. H.; & Muysken, Pieter C. (2004). The Languages of the Andes. Cambridge Language Surveys. Cambridge: Cambridge University Press.  .
 Brenzinger, Matthias (ed.) (1992) Language Death: Factual and Theoretical Explorations with Special Reference to East Africa. Berlin/New York: Mouton de Gruyter. .
 Campbell, Lyle; & Mithun, Marianne (Eds.). (1979). The Languages of Native America: Historical and Comparative Assessment. Austin: University of Texas Press.  .
 Davis, Wade. (2009). The Wayfinders: Why Ancient Wisdom Matters in the Modern World. House of Anansi Press. .
 Dorian, Nancy C. (1978). 'Fate of Morphological Complexity in Language Death: Evidence from East Sutherland Gaelic.' Language, 54 (3), 590-609.
 Dorian, Nancy C. (1981). Language Death: The Life Cycle of a Scottish Gaelic dialect. Philadelphia: University of Pennsylvania Press.  .
 Dressler, Wolfgand & Wodak-Leodolter, Ruth (eds.) (1977) 'Language Death' (International Journal of the Sociology of Language vol. 12). The Hague: Mouton.
 Gordon, Raymond G., Jr. (Ed.). (2005). Ethnologue: Languages of the World (15th ed.). Dallas, TX: SIL International. . (Online version: http://www.ethnologue.com).
 Harrison, K. David. (2007) When Languages Die: The Extinction of the World's Languages and the Erosion of Human Knowledge. New York and London: Oxford University Press.  .
 Mithun, Marianne. (1999). The Languages of Native North America. Cambridge: Cambridge University Press.  (hbk); .
 Mohan, Peggy; & Zador, Paul. (1986). 'Discontinuity in a Life Cycle: The Death of Trinidad Bhojpuri.' Language, 62 (2), 291-319.
 Sasse, Hans-Jürgen (1992) 'Theory of Language Death', in Brenzinger (ed.) Language Death, pp. 7–30.
 Schilling-Estes, Natalie; & Wolfram, Walt. (1999). 'Alternative Models of Dialect Death: Dissipation vs. Concentration.' Language, 75 (3), 486-521.
 Sebeok, Thomas A. (Ed.). (1973). Linguistics in North America (parts 1 & 2).  Current Trends in Linguistics (Vol. 10). The Hauge: Mouton. (Reprinted as Sebeok 1976).
 Sharp, Joanne. (2008). Chapter 6: 'Can the Subaltern Speak?', in Geographies of Postcolonialism. Glasgow, UK: SAGE Publications Ltd. .
 Skutnabb-Kangas, Tove. (2000). Linguistic Genocide in Education or Worldwide Diversity and Human Rights? Mahwah, New Jersey: Lawrence Erlbaum Associates. .
 Thomason, Sarah Grey & Kaufman, Terrence. (1991). Language Contact, Creolization, and Genetic Linguistics. University of California Press. .
 Timmons Roberts, J. & Hite, Amy. (2000). From Modernization to Globalization: Perspectives on Development and Social Change. Wiley-Blackwell. .

External links
 The Dodo's Fate: How Languages Become Extinct
 The Foundation of Endangered Languages
 Endangered Languages
 Photos of letters/characters from ancient and living languages featured on exterior walls of Library of Alexandria

Extinct languages